Bar Aftab-e Tahlivan (also Romanized as Bar Āftāb-e Tahlīvan; also known as Bar Āftāb, Bar Āftāb-e Bālā, and Bar Āftāb-e ‘Olyā) is a village in Chin Rural District, Ludab District, Boyer-Ahmad County, Kohgiluyeh and Boyer-Ahmad Province, Iran. At the 2006 census, its population was 112, in 17 families.

References 

Populated places in Boyer-Ahmad County